Kim Jeong-hu (born 26 September 1988) is a South Korean professional baseball pitcher who is currently a free agent. He graduated from Dankook University and was selected by the SK Wyverns in the second draft in 2013. Kim joined the SK Wyverns, but after injury and personal reasons he came out of the team after the 2014 season. He turned to pitcher and worked in Japan's independent league. He returned to South Korea in 2018 and joined the Doosan Bears.

References

External links 
 Career statistics and player information from Korea Baseball Organization

1988 births
Living people
Baseball players from Seoul
KBO League pitchers
SSG Landers players
Doosan Bears players